Golf Magazine is a monthly golf magazine. It was started in April 1959 by Universal Publishing and Distributing, who sold it to Times Mirror in 1972. Time Inc. acquired it in 2000. It was acquired by Howard Milstein in 2018. It was the world's most widely read golf publication from August 2006 to January 2007. The magazine is for golfers of all skill levels. Some features it includes are instruction from the top 100 teachers in America, interviews with famous golfers, tips on the best values for golf courses to go to on vacation, and an annual club test.

Top 100 courses  
Golf Magazine conducts an annual survey of experts to determine the best course in the United States and the world.

Top 100 in the United States 
The best courses in the United States in 2020 were:

Top 100 in the world 
Here are the top ten courses in the world in 2019:

Many countries had courses in the top one hundred, including:

Club Test 2007 

Golf Magazine also conducts an annual test of some of the finest golf products available so that the golfer will be armed with the knowledge of which club is the best value. Winners in each category were:

Notes
1 Percent rating was determined by dividing points earned by the most possible points the product could have earned
2 The game-improvement iron category was tested only by golfers with a 7 to 15 handicap.
3 The maximum game-improvement iron category was tested only by golfers with a 14 to 20 handicap.
4 The better-player iron category was tested only by golfers with handicaps 10 and under.

Top 100 Teachers in America 
Golf Magazine also honours some of the best instructors in the business. On the emeritus list are:

2011 player of the year selection

On November 1, 2011, Golf Magazine selected Rory McIlroy over Yani Tseng for its 2011 player of year. The magazine's editor, David Clarke wrote, “We are pleased to name Rory McIlroy as our inaugural Player of the Year.” Americans have embraced this young Northern Irishman, taking him into their hearts not just out of admiration for his amazing talent, but also for the grace he has shown in victory and defeat, his generosity of time with fans, and his commitments to causes beyond golf.”

The McIlroy selection was heavily criticized by golf bloggers. The #1 male player in the world at the time, Luke Donald, tweeted, "So rude and disrespectful of Yani. Whoever had final decision just diminished your magazine."

See also
Kingdom magazine

References

External links

1959 establishments in New York (state)
2018 mergers and acquisitions
Monthly magazines published in the United States
Sports magazines published in the United States
Magazine
Magazines established in 1959
Magazines published in New York City